Estudios Quanta, in São Paulo, is a Brazilian film studio and the country's largest rental house.  In 2010, Effi Wizen was the head of visual effects for Estudios Quanta.

References

External links
 www.estudiosquanta.com.br

Film studios
Film production companies of Brazil